Hans von Tübingen (1380 – February 1462) was an Austrian artist.  

Very little is known about his life, save that his work bears the influence of contemporary Burgundian and French painting. His name is known by signatures on some of his works. His output is sometimes conflated with that of the Master of the Saint Lambrecht Votive Altarpiece. He may also have been active as an etcher and painter of glass.

References
 K. Oettinger: Hans von Tübingen. In: Church Art 1933, p 5 ff.
 K. Oettinger: Hans von Tübingen to Wiener-Neustadt: the Master of St. Lambrecht. In: Yearbook of Art History Collections in Vienna 8 (1934), pp. 29-64
 H. Mahn: Hans von Tübingen and the Swabian flower painting. (Lecture, writings and lectures of the Württemberg Society of Sciences) Stuttgart 1937
 K. Oettinger: Hans von Tübingen and his school. (Research on the German art history 28). Berlin 1938
 K. Oettinger: Hans von Tübingen. In: Pantheon 26 (1940) pp. 201-207
 Otto Demus: Lower Austria. Hans von Tübingen, votive, masterpieces of Austrian panel painting. Klagenfurt / Vienna 1947
 Pesina J. (ed.): Old-German Master of Hans von Tübingen to Dürer and Cranach. Prague 1962 (i) (from the Czech)

14th-century births
1462 deaths
15th-century Austrian painters
Austrian male painters